General quarters, battle stations, or action stations is an announcement made aboard a naval warship to signal that all hands (everyone available) aboard a ship must go to battle stations (the positions they are to assume when the vessel is in combat) as quickly as possible.

According to The Encyclopedia of War, formerly "[i]n naval service, the phrase 'beat to quarters' indicated a particular kind of drum roll that ordered sailors to their posts for a fight where some would load and prepare to fire the ship's guns and others would arm with muskets and ascend the rigging as sharpshooters in preparation for combat."

Aboard U.S. Navy vessels, the following announcement would be made using the vessel’s public address system (known as the 1MC):

General Quarters, General Quarters. All hands man your battle stations. The route of travel is forward and up to starboard, down and aft to port. Set material condition 'Zebra' throughout the ship. Reason for General Quarters: (Inbound hostile aircraft/Hostile surface contact/etc.)

References

External links 
 Authentic US Navy Alarm Sounds, 24 January 2019

Naval warfare